John Pell Coster Train (May 25, 1928 – August 13, 2022) was an American investment advisor and writer. He was a founding editor of The Paris Review.

Early life
Train was born on the Upper East Side of Manhattan to Helen Coster Gerard and Arthur Train. His father was a district attorney in New York City and the author of the popular "Ephraim Tutt" stories that appeared in the Saturday Evening Post in the 1930s and 1940s. He graduated Groton School in 1946. He graduated from Harvard University with a Bachelor of Arts in 1950 and a Master of Arts in 1951. He was editor of The Harvard Lampoon and the Signet Society. In 1953, he co-founded and became the first managing editor of The Paris Review, which won attention by publishing extended interviews with such authors as Ernest Hemingway, Thornton Wilder and William Faulkner.

Career
Train served in the U.S. Army. After working in Wall Street, he founded the New York investment counsel firm now known as Train, Babcock Advisors. During this period, he became the principal owner of Château Malescasse, a Cru Bourgeois wine producer in Lamarque, Gironde in France. He was chairman of the Montrose Group, investment advisers and tax accountants, and was a director of a major emerging markets mutual fund.  He was the founder-chairman of the Train Foundation, which since 2000 has annually awarded the Civil Courage Prize for "steadfast resistance to evil at great personal risk." The Prize was inspired by the career of Aleksander Solzhenitsyn, with whom Train once worked closely. Asked whether he would prefer to receive the prize, or have it named after him, or be a judge, Solzhenitsyn chose the last, which he did to the end of his life. The trustees and directors of the Civil Courage Prize include five ambassadors: American, English and South African. He was an overseer of the Whitehead School of Diplomacy and International Relations at Seton Hall University (affiliated with the United Nations), and was a member of the Council on Foreign Relations and the International Institute of Strategic Studies (London).

Presidential appointments
Train received part-time appointments from Presidents Ronald Reagan, George H. W. Bush and Bill Clinton as a director of government agencies and entities dealing with Africa, Asia, and Central Europe, respectively.

Other distinctions
Train had two decorations from the Italian government for humanitarian work, and was an officer of the (British) Order of St. John. In 1980, he helped to establish the Afghanistan Relief Committee to provide medicine and food to the victims of the Soviet invasion, serving first as its treasurer and later as president.  The ARC merged with the International Rescue Committee, whose board he joined. He was an original trustee of the American University in Bulgaria.

Personal life
Train was a descendant of an old New England family, he was a cousin of the late United States Senator Claiborne Pell, chairman of the Senate Foreign Relations Committee, and of Russell E. Train, head of the United States Environmental Protection Agency under Richard Nixon and a founding trustee/former chairman of the World Wildlife Fund. John Train's siblings include ambassadors, military officers and other officials.

Train married Maria Teresa Cini di Pianzano; they had two daughters and later divorced. In 1977, he married Francie Cheston. and had two more daughters. One of his children became an active member of his firm. Another daughter was married to Paul Klebnikov, a journalist murdered in Russia.

Train died on August 13, 2022, at a hospital in Rockport, Maine, aged 94.

Select bibliography
Train wrote several hundred columns in the Wall Street Journal, Forbes, London's Financial Times, and other publications.  Also, about 25 books, translated into many languages, including:
 Money Masters of Our Time (HarperCollins)
 Investing and Managing Trusts Under the New Prudent Investor Rule: A Guide for Trustees, Investment Advisors, & Lawyers (Harvard)
 The Craft of Investing (HarperCollins)
 The Midas Touch: The Strategies That Have Made Warren Buffett "America's Preeminent Investor"  (HarperCollins)
 Dance of the Money Bees: A Professional Speaks Frankly on Investing (HarperCollins)
 The Olive: Tree of Civilization (M.T. Train/Scala Books)
 The Orange: Golden Joy (M.T. Train/Scala Books)
 Comfort Me With Apples (M.T. Train/Scala Books)

He has also written several humorous books, including John Train's Most Remarkable Names (which produced two sequels), Most Remarkable Occurrences,  Wit: The Best Things Ever Said, Love, and others (mostly HarperCollins), all in the same format.

References

External links
John Train's The Broadside : Blog, with excerpts from his columns and books
Train, Babcock Advisors LLC
Civil Courage Prize
John Train papers, MSS 58

1928 births
2022 deaths
20th-century American businesspeople
20th-century American male writers
20th-century American non-fiction writers
21st-century American male writers
21st-century American non-fiction writers
American expatriates in France
American finance and investment writers
American investment advisors
American magazine founders
American male non-fiction writers
American winemakers
Businesspeople from New York City
Groton School alumni
Harvard College alumni
Harvard Graduate School of Arts and Sciences alumni
People from the Upper East Side
The American Spectator people
The Harvard Lampoon alumni
United States Army soldiers